PATH (formerly known as the Program for Appropriate Technology in Health) is an international, nonprofit global health organization based in Seattle, with 1,600 employees in more than 70 countries around the world. Its president and CEO is Nikolaj Gilbert, who is also the Managing Director and CEO of Foundations for Appropriate Technologies in Health (FATH), PATH's Swiss subsidiary. PATH focuses on six platforms: vaccines, drugs, diagnostics, devices, system, and service innovations.

History

Founded in 1977 as the Program for the Introduction and Adaptation of Contraceptive Technology with a focus on family planning, PATH soon broadened its purpose to work on a wide array of emerging and persistent global health issues in the areas of health technologies, maternal health, child health, reproductive health, vaccines and immunization, and emerging and epidemic diseases such as HIV, malaria, tuberculosis, and COVID-19.

Since 2000, PATH expanded from about 300 employees and an annual budget of $60 million to, in 2020, a payroll of 1,600 people working in 70+ countries and a budget of $323 million.

PATH is one of the largest nonprofit organizations in global health today.

PATH's work
PATH is best known for developing and adapting technologies, such as improved vaccination devices and new tools to prevent cervical cancer, to address the health needs in low- and middle-income countries. It specializes in developing, introducing, and scaling up solutions to the world’s most pressing health challenges, in collaboration with funders, partner nonprofits, and the private sector. Steve Davis, PATH's President and CEO from 2012 to 2019, described the organization's role as a "bridge-builder and innovator on the global stage."

Vaccine and pharmaceutical technologies 
One of PATH's more-known technologies is the vaccine vial monitor, a small sticker that adheres to a vaccine vial and changes color as the vaccine is exposed to heat over time. The sticker helps health workers know when a vaccine has reached its preset temperature limit and can no longer be safely used. It promotes more reliable vaccinations as well as cost savings, because health workers no longer have to throw out vaccine just because they suspect it has gone bad. UNICEF requires these monitors on all vaccines it purchases. 

Another vaccine technology developed by PATH is the Uniject injection system. The single-dose, autodisabling injection system consists of a needle attached to a small bubble of plastic that is prefilled with medication. The system is designed to prevent disease transmission and enable health workers with only a little training to administer vaccine and other drugs in remote villages.

Nutrition 
PATH develops nutrition-focused innovations such as Ultra Rice, a manufactured, micronutrient-fortified "grain" that can be mixed with rice to fight malnutrition in countries where rice is a staple food.  Made of rice flour, micronutrients, and nutrient-protecting ingredients, Ultra Rice can mimic the look and taste of local rice and deliver the specific micronutrients a population needs. Ultra Rice has been produced and tested in several countries, including Brazil, Burundi, and India, where it has been served in school-lunch programs. PATH is working with partners in Cambodia to distribute Ultra Rice through food assistance programs and deepen the evidence base for rice fortification. In Brazil, PATH has partnered with a commercial rice producer to sell Ultra Rice on supermarket shelves and reach 10 million low-income consumers in three years.

Sexual and reproductive health 
Several PATH technologies address sexual and reproductive health, including:
 The careHPV test, developed in conjunction with Qiagen as the first molecular diagnostic to screen for human papillomavirus (HPV)—the most common cause of cervical cancer—in clinics in low-resource settings. China's State Food and Drug Administration approved the test for sale beginning in January 2013, followed by India and other emerging markets.  The test is designed specifically for use in clinics that lack reliable clean water or electricity.
  The SILCS diaphragm, a "one size fits most" contraceptive device. The device differs from traditional latex diaphragms in that it is made of silicone instead of latex, is designed to hold up to extreme temperatures and poor storage conditions common in developing countries, and will not require a doctor's fitting.
  The Woman's Condom, a new female condom designed to be more acceptable to both partners than other female condoms, plus easier to use, more secure, less noisy, and more comfortable.  PATH transferred production of the condom to Dahua Medical Apparatus Company in China in 2008. The condom has received regulatory approvals in China and the European Union and became commercially available in China in late 2011.

PATH employs a user-driven design process for its reproductive technologies to meet women's specific needs.

Water and sanitation 
PATH looks at ways to improve water quality in developing countries, including helping companies develop low-cost filters, gadgets, and other water-treatment products to stimulate a commercial market and keep prices low. Most recently, PATH partnered with Splash! to develop and test a handwashing station for use in LMICs, specifically in response to the COVID-19 pandemic.

Vaccines and immunization
PATH is working with biotechnology and pharmaceutical companies to support the development of vaccines for diseases such as meningitis  and pneumonia and to help countries introduce vaccines for childhood illnesses such as rotavirus and Japanese encephalitis.

Meningitis
PATH and the World Health Organization, through the Meningitis Vaccine Project, led the development of a vaccine called MenAfriVac to end meningitis A epidemics in sub-Saharan Africa, where 450 million people in 26 countries are at risk of the disease. The vaccine was developed by Serum Institute of India and introduced in Burkina Faso, Mali, and Niger in December 2010 to prevent the spread of a strain of meningitis found only in Africa. Within six months, the vaccine eliminated new cases of meningitis A in the areas where it was introduced.   By the end of 2012, the vaccine had reached 100 million people in ten countries: Benin, Burkina Faso, Cameroon, Chad, Ghana, Mali, Niger, Nigeria, Senegal, and Sudan.   The introduction of MenAfriVac marked the first time that a vaccine was developed for a disease only found in Africa.

Previously used meningitis vaccines had low efficacy and cost USD $80 per dose. The new vaccine has high efficacy against the type of meningitis that is most prevalent in Africa and costs less than $0.50 per dose.  The entire vaccination research and development project cost less than US$100 million, about one-fifth the typical cost for developing a vaccine.

In 2012, MenAfriVac was also approved for storage without refrigeration for up to four days, enabling health workers to more easily reach patients in rural villages or in areas with no power.

Rotavirus
PATH supports the introduction of vaccines against rotavirus in developing countries to protect young children from severe diarrhea. In 2006, PATH helped Nicaragua become the first developing country to introduce rotavirus vaccines within months of their introduction.  Former PATH researcher John Wecker noted that rotavirus infections dropped in areas that began to use the vaccine after the WHO recommended its international use in 2009.

PATH also conducts research to show the impact of rotavirus vaccines and help countries choose whether to adopt the vaccines into their immunization programs.

Japanese encephalitis
PATH is working with India and other countries in the region to introduce an affordable vaccine to protect against Japanese encephalitis—a disease the World Health Organization estimates claims 10,000 to 15,000 lives a year, mostly children, and causes permanent brain damage in many more.  In 2006, PATH helped the government of India launch an immunization campaign to reach millions of children in high-risk areas with the vaccine.

Epidemic diseases
Part of PATH's work focuses on some of the most widespread and threatening global diseases: malaria, HIV/AIDS, tuberculosis, and influenza.

Malaria
The PATH Malaria Vaccine Initiative supports several malaria vaccine candidates at various stages of development around the world, including the most advanced candidate, called RTS,S. Researchers are studying RTS,S, made by GlaxoSmithKline, in phase 3 clinical trials among infants and young children in sub-Saharan Africa. Interim results of the study released in 2011 showed the vaccine provided about 50 percent protection against malaria for young children ages 5 to 17 months. Interim study results released in 2012 showed RTS,S reduced cases of malaria among infants by 33 percent. In October 2013, GlaxoSmithKline reported that the experimental vaccine reduced the number of cases amongst young children by almost 50 percent and among infants by around 25 percent, following the conclusion of an 18-month clinical trial.  GlaxoSmithKline is set to submit an application for a marketing license with the European Medicines Agency (EMA) in 2014.  The new vaccine has the backing of the UN's Swiss-based WHO which states that it will recommend the use of RTS,S for use starting in 2015, providing it gets approval.

Another PATH initiative to address malaria is the Malaria Control and Evaluation Partnership in Africa (MACEPA), which focuses on controlling malaria through the use of insecticide-treated bednets, indoor spraying of insecticides, new diagnostic tools to find infection, and effective medicines for treatment.  In Zambia, this work has helped decrease the rate of malaria among children younger than age 5 by 50 percent in two years.

In December 2012, PATH received an award from the US President's Malaria Initiative for a new malaria project focused on "the expansion of high-quality diagnosis and treatment for malaria and other childhood illnesses and infectious diseases."

PATH's Drug Development program, which grew out of an affiliation with OneWorld Health, is advancing a new, semisynthetic form of the malaria drug artemisinin that will bolster the current, volatile botanical supply.  In August 2014, PATH and Sanofi announced the release of the first batch of semisynthetic artemisinin.  1.7 million doses of Sanofi's ArteSunate AmodiaQuine Winthrop (ASAQ Winthrop), a fixed-dose artemisinin-based combination therapy will be shipped to half a dozen African countries over the next few months.

HIV/AIDS
PATH works in Africa, Asia, and other regions to slow the spread of HIV/AIDS and provide support for people affected by the disease. In Kenya, where PATH has worked for more than 20 years, the organization conducts research into "multipurpose prevention technologies" that can protect women from HIV and pregnancy  and provides support groups and health services for married adolescents and other groups at high risk for HIV.  It also leads a large project with local governments and community organizations to strengthen and expand services for HIV/AIDS, malaria, tuberculosis, and maternal and newborn health.

Other PATH projects to address HIV in Africa include improving access to HIV treatment and services in Ethiopia  and expanding HIV counseling and testing and other services in the Democratic Republic of Congo.

PATH uses behavior change communication techniques to encourage healthy behaviors for HIV prevention. One of the best-known examples is PATH's work with "magnet theater" in Kenya, India, Vietnam, and other developing countries. Named because of its natural pulling power, this interactive street theater draws people in rural communities to clearings, dirt roads, and village centers—any open space where people can gather. There, actors banter with their audiences and pull them into the play, stimulating dialogue about HIV/AIDS and other taboo subjects and helping individuals re-examine behaviors that contribute to poor health.

Maternal and child health
In addition to its work on vaccines for childhood illnesses, PATH addresses pregnancy complications, nutrition issues, and other health challenges that affect women and children in developing countries and lead to higher rates of illness and death.

In 2012, PATH completed a seven-year project in India focused on safe birth for mothers and babies. PATH worked with local governments and community groups to encourage community leaders, health workers, pregnant women, and families to deliver babies in health centers, rather than at home, and adopt other best practices to protect mothers and their infants during pregnancy, childbirth, and infancy. The project used community outreach approaches including door-to-door clinical surveillance, distribution of printed health materials, and street theater to spread messages about maternal and newborn health.

In South Africa, PATH leads a five-year project to improve the health and development of 750,000 pregnant women and children by encouraging breastfeeding and improving health care for pregnant women and young children.

Funding and expenses
PATH's income in 2020 was $303,223,000 and its expenses in 2020 were US$294,369,000. 86.4% of its budget was spent on program activities, 12.8% on administration, and .8% on fundraising.

In 2010, PATH received the most US foundation grants in the state of Washington and ranked thirteenth among international recipients of US foundation grants.

Controversies
In 2012, the NGO was warned by the Indian government after one of its studies involving an HPV vaccine resulted in the alleged death of seven girls belonging to an indigenous community (tribe) in India.

All 7 deaths were later attributed to other causes, including a snake bite, drowning, suicide by pesticide ingestion, and complications from malaria.

In what The Hindu called "a shockingly unethical trial",  nearly 2,800 consent forms were signed by a hostel warden or headmaster, as the 'guardian'.

Recognition
In 2003, PATH received the Tech Museum's Dr. Alejandro Zaffaroni Health Award for its work on the Uniject device, a sterile pre-filled, single-use syringe.

Since 2005, PATH has remained on Forbes' top 200 list of the 200 largest charities in America.

For five years running, Fast Company magazine in 2008 named PATH as one of the top social entrepreneurs who are changing the world.

In 2009, PATH received the Conrad N. Hilton Humanitarian Prize.

In 2012, PATH was ranked as the sixth best NGO in the world on the "top 100" list published by The Global Journal.

As of March 2019, PATH has been vetted and is in good standing as part of GlobalGiving's GG Rewards program.

See also
 Philanthropy
 Concept Foundation
 Reproductive Health Supplies Coalition
 GAVI Alliance
 Global health
 Zika virus

References

Further reading
An Introduction to Social Entrepreneurship
OECD Studies on SMEs and Entrepreneurship SMEs
The Search for Social Entrepreneurship
Social Problems
Novick & Morrow's Public Health Administration
Bioproperty, Biomedicine and Deliberative Governance
Pharmaceutical and Biomedical Project Management in a Changing Global Environment

External links 
 

Health charities in the United States
International medical and health organizations
Non-profit organizations based in Seattle
Organizations established in 1977
Research institutes in Seattle
Charities based in Washington (state)
Medical and health organizations based in Washington (state)
Medical research institutes in the United States